Lermontovo; formerly known as Voskresenovka, is a village in the Lori Province of Armenia. Like its neighbor, Fioletovo, it was settled in the mid-1800s by Spiritual Christians from Russia (Pryguny, Molokane). The village is named after Russian poet Mikhail Lermontov, often called "the poet of the Caucasus".

References
 (as Lermontovo)

Populated places in Lori Province
Mikhail Lermontov